Acronychia crassipetala, commonly known as crater aspen, is a species of small rainforest tree that is endemic to north-eastern Queensland. It has simple, elliptic to egg-shaped leaves on cylindrical stems, flowers in small groups, and fleshy, more or less spherical fruit.

Description

Taxonomy
Acronychia crassipetala was first formally described in 1974 by Thomas Gordon Hartley in the Journal of the Arnold Arboretum from specimens collected on Mount Spurgeon.

Distribution and habitat

Conservation status
Crater aspen is classified as of "least concern" under the Queensland Government Nature Conservation Act 1992.

References

crassipetala
Flora of Queensland
Plants described in 1974
Taxa named by Thomas Gordon Hartley